The 2015–16 season is Rochdale's 109th year in existence and their second consecutive season in League One. Along with competing in League One, the club will also participate in the FA Cup, League Cup and JP Trophy. The season covers the period from 1 July 2015 to 30 June 2016.

Statistics

																																			

|}

Transfers

Transfers in

Transfers out

Loans out

Competitions

Pre-season friendlies
On 8 May 2015, Rochdale confirmed their first pre-season friendly against Macclesfield Town on 18 July 2015. On 11 May 2015, the second confirmed pre-season friendly was announced against Chester on 14 July 2015. On 14 May 2015, a friendly against AFC Fylde was announced. A day later the club confirmed their fourth friendly, against Blackburn Rovers. On 21 May 2015, a fifth friendly was announced against Huddersfield Town. On 29 May 2015, Rochdale announced they will face Accrington Stanley on 28 July 2015. On 21 July 2015, Dale announced a third pre-season friendly.

League One

League table

Matches
On 17 June 2015, the fixtures for the forthcoming season were announced.

FA Cup
On 26 October 2015, the first round draw was made. Rochdale were drawn at home against Swindon Town. Rochdale were at home to Bury in the second round.

League Cup
On 16 June 2015, the first round draw was made, Rochdale were drawn at home against Coventry City. Rochdale were drawn away to Hull City in the second round.

Football League Trophy
On 5 September 2015, the second round draw was shown live on Soccer AM and drawn by Charlie Austin and Ed Skrein. Rochdale will host Chesterfield.

Lancashire Senior Cup
On the Lancashire FA website the first round details were announced, Rochdale will face Manchester United.

References

Rochdale
Rochdale A.F.C. seasons